The 2008–09 Syracuse Orange men's basketball team represented Syracuse University in the 2008–09 NCAA Division I men's basketball season. The head coach was Jim Boeheim, serving for his 33rd year. The team played its home games at the Carrier Dome in Syracuse, New York.  Key contributors included senior Kristof Ongenaet, juniors Eric Devendorf, Arinze Onuaku, Andy Rautins and Paul Harris, sophomores Rick Jackson and Jonny Flynn and freshman Kris Joseph.

Preseason

Roster changes

Syracuse lost its leading scorer from the previous season, forward Donté Greene, who declared for the 2008 NBA draft and was taken with the 28th overall pick by the Memphis Grizzlies.  Greene was then traded to the Houston Rockets and again to the Sacramento Kings.

Syracuse used Greene's scholarship to add Iowa State transfer Wesley Johnson. Johnson averaged 12.4 points per game during his sophomore season with the Cyclones, but must sit out the 2008–09 season. Syracuse will also have lacrosse recruit Kevin Drew, a walk-on.

On the injury front, Syracuse returned juniors Eric Devendorf and Andy Rautins. Both had suffered season ending knee injuries in the 2007–08 season and were granted medical redshirts. However, the Orange also learned before the season started that sophomore Scoop Jardine would be out for entire season after suffering a stress fracture in his left leg.

Recruiting
Coach Boeheim was able to sign three recruits for the 2008–09 season: Kris Joseph, Mookie Jones and James Southerland. However, Southerland did not qualify with his SAT score to attend Syracuse, and returned to Notre Dame Preparatory Academy for an additional season of play.

Preseason outlook

With returning co-Big East Rookie of The Year Jonny Flynn, the Orange was picked to finish eighth in the Big East conference by the Big East coach's poll. Flynn was also a first-team all-Big East selection. Syracuse began the season ranked No. 30 in the Associated Press poll and No. 31 in the ESPN/USA Today poll.

Although Syracuse was coming off two-straight NIT-bound seasons, and despite not having won an NCAA tournament game in four seasons, many experts picked Syracuse as a solid choice for the NCAA Tournament.

Roster

Players

Coaches

Season

Season Recap 

Syracuse started the season strong, winning the CBE Classic. In the semifinals on November 24, 2008, the Orange topped No. 17/18 Florida, 89–83. Jonny Flynn and Paul Harris led five SU players in double figures with 18 points each. In the finals on November 25, 2008, Syracuse defeated the defending champions, the No. 22/23 Kansas Jayhawks, 89–81 in overtime, to capture the CBE Classic. Jonny Flynn had 25 points, including a 3-pointer with 6.4 seconds left in regulation to send the game to overtime. Flynn was named MVP of the tournament.

But the season would hit a low point on December 15, 2008 when then-No. 11 Syracuse lost to unranked Cleveland State University 72–69 as a result of a 60-foot, buzzer-beating shot by Cleveland State's Cedric Jackson.

Syracuse would add another key non-conference win on December 20, 2008, when then-No. 11 Syracuse won a key away game against national runner-up Memphis as Syracuse's stifling zone held Memphis to just 7-for-33 shooting from 3-point land. Flynn paced the Orange with 24 points and six assists, as Syracuse was able to deal with the loss of Eric Devendorf to a suspension after he was accused of hitting a female student on Nov. 1.

Perhaps the biggest game of the season happened on March 12–13, 2009, when then-No. 18 Syracuse and No. 4 Connecticut played the longest game in Big East history, and second longest in NCAA Division I history, as Syracuse won 127–117 in six overtimes.  Flynn set a new Syracuse record by playing 67 minutes.

Syracuse would be named a No. 3 seed for the NCAA Tournament and win games over Stephen F. Austin (59–44) and Arizona State (78–67) to advance to the Sweet 16. But the Orange would be halted by Blake Griffin and Oklahoma in an 84–71 loss. The loss would mark the final game for Devendorf, Flynn and Harris, who all left the team following the season for the professional ranks.

Big East tournament 

Syracuse was seeded sixth and received a bye in the first round. They reached the finals of the 2009 tournament, where they were defeated by the first-seeded Louisville Cardinals, 76–66. It was their fourteenth time making the Big East tournament finals, the most for any team in the conference.

Prior to making the finals, Syracuse's performance featured a conference record six-overtime quarterfinals game (the second longest game in NCAA history) in which they defeated third-seeded Connecticut 127–117. A day later, in the semifinals, the Orange were forced into overtime again, where they defeated West Virginia 74–69 in a single extra session.

Jonny Flynn was named the tournament's most outstanding player, becoming just the fourth player in Big East tournament history to win the award as a member of the second-place team.

NCAA tournament 

The Orange were seeded third in the South Region, and played fourteenth-seeded Stephen F. Austin on Friday, March 20 at American Airlines Arena in Miami, Florida.  The Orange won, 59–44.  They faced sixth-seeded Arizona State in the second round, winning 78–67.  Their season ended in the South regional semifinals when they lost 84–71 to Oklahoma.

Schedule

|-
!colspan=12 style=|Exhibition

|-
!colspan=12 style=|Regular Season

|-
!colspan=12 style=|Big East tournament 

|-
!colspan=12 style=|NCAA Tournament†

Rankings

References

Syracuse
Syracuse
Syracuse Orange men's basketball seasons
Syracuse Orange men's basketball
Syracuse Orange men's basketball